Lianhuashan may refer to:
Guangdong, China
Lotus Hill, hill in Panyu, Guangzhou
Lianhuashan Park, hill and urban park in Shenzhen

See also
Lin Fa Shan, hill in Hong Kong
Yeonhwasan (disambiguation)